Ali Jabbari  is an Iranian former football midfielder who played for Iran in the 1972 Summer Olympics. He also played for Taj SC. On 13 May 1972 during a group match at the 1972 AFC Asian Cup, Iran were trailing 2–0 to Thailand. Ali Jabbari turned the match around with a hat-trick in the space of 8 minutes, with goals in 80', 86' and 88', giving Iran first place in the group. He scored again in the final in which Iran beat South Korea.

Record at Olympic Games

Honours

Iran
 Asian Nations Cup
Winner: 2
1968, 1972

 Asian Games
Winner: 1
1974
Runner up: 1
1966

Taj
 Asian Champions League
Winner: 1
1970 

Third Place: 1
1971 

Iranian Football League
Winner: 2
1970–71
1974–75 
Runner up: 1
1973–74

Tehran Football League
Winner: 3
1969 
1970–1971
1972–73

References

External links
 
 
 Ali Jabbari at TeamMelli.com

1946 births
Living people
Iran international footballers
Iranian footballers
rah Ahan players
Esteghlal F.C. players
Footballers at the 1972 Summer Olympics
Olympic footballers of Iran
Asian Games gold medalists for Iran
Asian Games silver medalists for Iran
Asian Games medalists in football
Footballers at the 1966 Asian Games
AFC Asian Cup-winning players
1968 AFC Asian Cup players
1972 AFC Asian Cup players
Footballers at the 1970 Asian Games
Footballers at the 1974 Asian Games
Association football midfielders
Medalists at the 1966 Asian Games